UltraPort may refer to: 

 ThinkPad UltraPort - the IBM nonstandard USB connection
 Ultra Port Architecture - the Sun Microsystems proprietary bus